In mathematics, a Néron differential, named after André Néron, is an almost canonical choice of 1-form on an elliptic curve or abelian variety defined over a local field or global field. The Néron differential behaves well on the Néron minimal models.

For an elliptic curve of the form

the Néron differential is

References
 
 

Elliptic curves